Torin-1 is a drug which was one of the first non-rapalog derived inhibitors of the mechanistic target of rapamycin (mTOR) subtypes mTORC1 and mTORC2. In animal studies it has anti-inflammatory, anti-cancer, and anti-aging properties, and shows activity against neuropathic pain.

References 

Enzyme inhibitors